Short Cut Draw Blood is the third studio album by the British musician Jim Capaldi, released by Island Records in 1975. It marked a major turning point in Capaldi's career: it was his first album recorded after the breakup of Traffic, and more importantly it was his commercial breakthrough. While Capaldi's first two solo albums had been moderately successful in the United States (in fact, in Short Cut Draw Blood was his least successful album in the United States thus far, with both the album itself at number 193 and the single "Love Hurts" barely scraping into the Billboard charts at number 97), Short Cut Draw Blood entered the charts in several other countries for the first time. This was particularly evident in his native United Kingdom; the single "It's All Up to You" at number 27, released a year before the album, became his first top 40 hit there, only to be overshadowed the following year by his cover of "Love Hurts", which went all the way to number 4.

The title of the album was conceived by co-producer Chris Blackwell.

Background
The song "Boy with a Problem" was written about former Traffic bandmate Chris Wood, whose self-destructive tendencies (particularly his drug addiction) were a cause of increasing concern for Capaldi. The song features Paul Kossoff on guitar.

Reception

Rolling Stone called the album "still uneven" and "unfocused" but a promising step forward from his first solo work. Their review approved of both the session musicians and the arrangements, but criticized Capaldi's lyrics as "simply absurd" or "rather embarrassingly sentimental", being at his best only on the cover of "Love Hurts", where "he brings a sense of pain very different from Roy Orbison's original."

AllMusic's retrospective review was more satisfied with the variety of styles, commenting "dipping into a wide range of musical styles, there is something for everyone on Short Cut Draw Blood", and saying the album is even better than his first. On the contrary, Classic Rock review lamented "too much disjointed dabbling and lack of cohesion" on "several cuts, sounding awkwardly like below-par leftovers from the previous album."

Track listing 
All tracks composed by Jim Capaldi, except where indicated.
Side one
 "Goodbye Love"
 Jim Capaldi - vocals, drum machine
 Ray Allen - saxophone
 Steve Winwood - guitar, organ, piano, bass
 Remi Kabaka - percussion
 Rebop Kwaku Baah - percussion
 "It's All Up to You"
 Jim Capaldi - drums, vocals, percussion
 Jess Roden - guitar
 John "Rabbit" Bundrick - piano, clavinet
 Phil Chen - bass
 Harry Robinson - string arrangements
 "Love Hurts" (Boudleaux Bryant)
 Jim Capaldi - vocals
 Chris Spedding - guitar
 Steve Winwood - piano
 Jean Roussel - electric piano, minimoog
 Rosko Gee - bass
 Gerry Conway - drums
 Ray Allen - percussion
 Harry Robinson - string arrangements
 "Johnny Too Bad" (Trevor "Batman" Wilson, Winston Bailey, Roy Beckford, Derrick Crooks - The Slickers cover)
 Jim Capaldi - vocals
 Ray Allen - saxophone
 Muscle Shoals Horns - horns
 Pete Carr - lead guitar
 Jimmy Johnson - rhythm guitar, horn arrangements
 Peter Yarrow - acoustic guitar
 Barry Beckett - piano, organ
 David Hood - bass
 Roger Hawkins - drums, spoons
 Rebop Kwaku Baah - percussion
 Remi Kabaka - percussion
 "Short Cut Draw Blood"
 Jim Capaldi - vocals, percussion
 Pete Carr - lead guitar
 Chris Spedding - rhythm guitar
 Jimmy Johnson - electric guitar
 Barry Beckett - piano
 David Hood - bass
 Roger Hawkins - drums
 Rebop Kwaku Baah - percussion

Side two
 "Living on a Marble"
 Jim Capaldi - vocals, percussion
 Chris Spedding - lead guitar
 Jimmy Johnson - rhythm guitar
 Pete Carr - acoustic guitar
 Barry Beckett - piano
 Steve Winwood - bass
 Roger Hawkins - drums
 "Boy with a Problem"
 Jim Capaldi - vocals
 Paul Kossoff - lead guitar
 Jimmy Johnson - rhythm guitar
 Pete Carr - acoustic guitar
 Steve Winwood - synthesizer
 Barry Beckett - piano
 David Hood - bass
 Roger Hawkins - drums
 Rebop Kwaku Baah - percussion
 Harry Robinson - string arrangements
 "Keep On Trying"
 Jim Capaldi - vocals
 Ray Allen - saxophone
 Rico Rodriguez - trombone
 Phil - guitar
 Steve Winwood - piano, organ
 Rosko Gee - bass
 Remi Kabaka - drums
 Rebop Kwaku Baah - percussion
 "Seagull"
 Jim Capaldi - vocals
 Steve Winwood - acoustic guitar, Mellotron, harpsichord
 Chris Wood - flute
 Remi Kabaka - percussion

One further track from the sessions, "Sugar Honey", was released as a b-side. Aside from Jim Capaldi on vocals, the performing personnel on the track are not known.

2012 Reissue
In March 2012 Raven an Australian label reissued Short Cut Draw Blood along with The Contender as a 2 for 1 CD release with 8 bonus tracks, all of them previously released recordings: "Tricky Dicky Rides Again", "Sugar Honey", "If You Think You Know How to Love Me", "Good Night & Good Morning", "Talkin' Bout My Baby", "Still Talkin'", "Goodbye My Love", "Baby You're Not My Problem". The second disc included all the tracks from both the UK The Contender and its USA counterpart Daughter of the Night. The reissue was remastered by Warren Barnett and featured a booklet that discussed the making of both albums.

References

External links
Jim Capaldi's official website

1975 albums
Jim Capaldi albums
Albums produced by Chris Blackwell
Island Records albums
Albums recorded at Muscle Shoals Sound Studio